Rocky Rococo Pizza and Pasta is a chain of North American restaurants that specializes in pan-style pizza sold by the slice. It was founded in Madison, Wisconsin, in 1974 by a pair of college students who took the name from a character invented in 1969 by the Firesign Theatre. The chain grew as large as 120 stores in 1986, and the owners sold the franchise rights to another partner and group of investors in 1988. Today there are still 40 locations in the Midwest.

History 
Wayne Mosley and Roger Brown opened their first store in Madison, Wisconsin, in 1974. 
The name "Rocky Rococo" was invented in 1969 by the Firesign Theatre for a villain in the "Further Adventures of Nick Danger" sketch on their second comedy album, How Can You Be in Two Places at Once When You're Not Anywhere at All. The character was based on Dashiell Hammett's Joel Cairo as portrayed by Peter Lorre in the 1941 film The Maltese Falcon. The name is a parody of a character invented by the Beatles for their song Rocky Raccoon. The Firesign character is described as a dwarf and depicted as bald and wearing a fez. The company's web site does not mention either the Firesign Theatre or the Beatles character as inspiration for the name.

To design their restaurant's logo, Mosley and Brown hired a Madison artist to sketch a character based on the White Spy character from Mad Magazine, and hired comic actor Jim Pederson to portray their "Rocky Rococo" mascot as a moustachioed Italian wearing a white suit, wide-brimmed hat, and sunglasses. Pederson died at age 68 on February 4, 2016.

Copyright dispute
The Firesign Theatre visited the first Rocky Rococo Pizza when on tour in Madison in 1975, and reacted with good humor, joking around with the owners and giving them pictures that said, "To Rocky, from Rocky" which were hung on the wall. But in 1985, when the chain had grown to 62 restaurants, the Firesign Theatre sent the owners a letter claiming ownership of the name. Their lawyers found a similar case where an Austin, Texas, pizzeria named Conan's ran afoul of the copyright owners, producers of the 1982 film Conan the Barbarian. Since the creator of the Conan the Barbarian comic had similarly endorsed the restaurant by drawing Conan on its walls, the suit lost in the United States Court of Appeals for the Fifth Circuit. The Firesigns thus settled out of court.

By 1986, the chain had grown to 120 stores, according to the company. Mosley and Brown sold the franchise rights to Tom Hester and a group of investors in 1988. Mosley died at his home in Madison on November 28, 2017, aged 70.

Locations 

, there were 39 Rocky Rococo locations, mostly in Wisconsin, with one in Minnesota. A Spokane, Washington, location was shut down on May 1, 2020, subsequent to its temporary closure in April due to COVID-19. At one time, the chain generated about $40 million in annual sales. The chain previously had locations in Florida, Colorado, Oklahoma, Nebraska, Missouri, Michigan, Iowa, Indiana, Illinois, Kentucky and Ohio.

See also
 List of pizza chains of the United States

References

External links 
 

Pizza chains of the United States
Companies based in Wisconsin
Economy of Madison, Wisconsin
Regional restaurant chains in the United States
1974 establishments in Wisconsin
Restaurants established in 1974